Savidor may refer to:

Menachem Savidor,  Israeli politician
Tel Aviv Savidor Central Railway Station